The University of Aizu in Aizuwakamatsu, Japan, is the first  university dedicated to computer science engineering in Japan. 

UoA was ranked 18th (2nd among public universities) and was ranked 7th in the field of computer science in "THE World University Rankings Japan 2022" by Times Higher Education (THE), a British education magazine, released on March 25, 2021. This ranking evaluates universities based on 16 indicators in four areas: educational resources, educational enrichment, educational outcomes, and internationalization, and the University of Aizu was ranked second among public universities. 

It was ranked 1st in Fostering Entrepreneurship Number of university-launched ventures(Public universities in Japan). The UoA is recognized by many companies and has maintained nearly a 100% of employment rate since its foundation.

Description
The University of Aizu is in Aizuwakamatsu city in Fukushima prefecture, Japan.

The university specializes in computer science education, both hardware and software, at the undergraduate and postgraduate levels. It is known for its open access to computers; there is a 1:1 ratio of computers to students, and students have access to a computer 24 hours a day. Additionally, the computers are replaced every three years, so the available computer equipment is always recent technology.

 
In addition to computer science, English language education is an important aspect of the University of Aizu. The university is officially bilingual and all official meetings and correspondence are interpreted and translated. Approximately 40% of professors come from overseas, including countries such as Vietnam, India, South Korea, Canada, United States, Russia and China. Not only do students enroll in English courses throughout their undergraduate programs, many of their computer science courses are taught in English. Students are required to write a graduation thesis in English. The university has international students at the masters and doctoral levels.

In 2005, the University of Aizu was chosen by the Japanese government, along with 20 other universities, to be a national center responsible for the improvement of international education. In this role, the University of Aizu carries out computer science research in collaboration with foreign universities such as Shanghai University, China and Saint Petersburg State University, Russia. The University of Aizu has research ties with many universities overseas, has international staff, and accepts students from abroad.

The president is MIYAZAKI Toshiaki.

Top Global University
In September 2014, the Ministry of Education, Culture, Sports, Science and Technology (MEXT) selected the University of Aizu as one among 37 universities for the Top Global University Project.

Campus
The university is located on a 20 hectare campus in Aizu-Wakamatsu, Fukushima. The university has a student dormitory, sports and swimming facilities, and numerous playing fields.

Faculties and graduate schools
Computer Science and Engineering
Information Technology and Project Management

Graduate fields of study
Computer Devices
Information Systems
Computer Network Systems
Recognition and the Human Interface
Algorithms and Theoretical Computer Science
Computer Organization and Parallel Processing
Synthetic Worlds, Virtual Reality and Multimedia
Knowledge Engineering, Cybernetics and Software Systems
Software Engineering and Information Technology

Research institutes, centers, and facilities
University Business Innovation Center
Center for Language Research

References

External links

University of Aizu--- Official Website

Educational institutions established in 1993
Public universities in Japan
Universities and colleges in Fukushima Prefecture
1993 establishments in Japan
Aizuwakamatsu